Corey Leshaad Wimberly (born October 26, 1983) is an American former professional baseball player and manager who works in the Minor League Baseball system of the Boston Red Sox.

Wimberly spent 10 seasons playing in the minor leagues as an infielder and outfielder, including four seasons at the Triple-A level, before retiring after the 2016 season. Wimberly has since worked in Boston's minor-league organization; during the 2018 season, he was one of only nine African American managers across 160 minor-league teams.

Playing career

Amateur
Wimberly attended Alcorn State University in Mississippi, where he played college baseball for the Braves. As a freshman in 2004, Wimberly earned multiple honors: Louisville Slugger Freshman All-American, SWAC Freshman and Newcomer of the Year, First-Team All-Conference, and Second-Team All-Blackcollegebaseball.com. After batting .420 in 42 games in 2004, he hit .462 in 38 games in 2005.

Professional
Wimberly was selected by the Colorado Rockies in the sixth round of the 2005 MLB Draft; he signed with the Rockies, receiving a signing bonus of $145,000. Wimberly played in the Rockies' farm system from 2005 through 2008, reaching as high as Double-A. In February 2009, he was traded to the Oakland Athletics for Matt Murton. With Oakland, Wimberly spent most of 2009 in Double-A, batting .296 in 70 games, and all of 2010 in Triple-A, batting .284 in 135 games.

In December 2010, Wimberly was traded to the Indianapolis Indians, Triple-A affiliate of the Pittsburgh Pirates. With Indianapolis during the 2011 season, he hit .238 in 56 games, spending three stints on the disabled list. In November 2011, he elected to become a free agent. In December 2011, Wimberly signed with the New York Mets and was assigned to their Triple-A team, the Buffalo Bisons. In 39 games with Buffalo he hit .301, while spending nearly two months on the disabled list. In November 2012, he again elected to become a free agent.

In April 2013, Wimberly joined the Gwinnett Braves, Triple-A affiliate of the Atlanta Braves, where he hit .234 in 25 games. The Braves released him at the end of May. In June, he joined the Pensacola Blue Wahoos, Double-A affiliate of the Cincinnati Reds. He hit .260 in 59 games for Pensacola. In November 2013, he again elected to become a free agent. In December 2013, Wimberly signed with the Minnesota Twins, and was assigned to the Double-A New Britain Rock Cats. During the 2014 season, he hit .252 in 72 games for New Britain, and additionally played in several Gulf Coast League games while rehabilitating from an injury.

Overall, in 10 minor league seasons, Wimberly batted .289 with 12 home runs and 253 RBIs in 820 games. He played games at all infield positions except first base, and at all outfield positions. He stole 50 or more bases in a season three times, including 59 with the Double-A Tulsa Drillers in 2008.

Wimberly finished his playing career with Leones de Yucatán of the Mexican League during the 2015 and 2016 seasons, batting .340 and .338, respectively.

Post-playing career
Following his playing career, Wimberly joined the Boston Red Sox organization in 2017 as assistant manager for the Class A Greenville Drive. In January 2018, Wimberly was named manager of Boston's Class A Short Season affiliate, the Lowell Spinners; the team finished the season with a record of 37–38. In January 2019, Wimberly was promoted to manager of Boston's Class A-Advanced affiliate, the Salem Red Sox; they went on to compile a 67–70 record. He was named to return to Salem in 2020, but the season was canceled due to the COVID-19 pandemic. In January 2021, Wimberly was promoted to manager of Boston's Double-A affiliate, the Portland Sea Dogs; the team posted a 67–47 record. In February 2022, Wimberly was named minor league outfield/baserunning coordinator for the Red Sox.

Managerial record

Source:

References

Further reading

External links
, or MiLB.com

1983 births
Living people
African-American baseball coaches
African-American baseball managers
African-American baseball players
American expatriate baseball players in Mexico
Alcorn State Braves baseball players
Alcorn State University alumni
Baseball coaches from Florida
Baseball players from Jacksonville, Florida
Buffalo Bisons (minor league) players
Casper Rockies players
Gulf Coast Twins players
Gwinnett Braves players
Indianapolis Indians players
Leones de Yucatán players
Lowell Spinners managers
Mexican League baseball center fielders
Midland RockHounds players
Minor league baseball coaches
Modesto Nuts players
New Britain Rock Cats players
Pensacola Blue Wahoos players
Sacramento River Cats players
Salem Red Sox managers
Tulsa Drillers players
21st-century African-American sportspeople
20th-century African-American people